Mliba is a town geographically located in east central Eswatini, in the southeast of Africa. It is situated on the MR5 route to the northeast of Manzini, between the towns of Luve and Madlangempisi.
Hence, on the 22nd of October 2022 marked yet another day in History at eMvelo lendzala situated around Mliba area which was of the presentation of the areas new Chief known as Madubane who has since taken over the reigns as the areas new traditional leader. Community members in a jovial mood, it was drizzling as it is known that the Magagula have the rain making powers.

Mliba has a police station, a Nazarene mission which consists of a primary school and a clinic which stands as a health-care center, and Mliba high school.

The people of Mliba practice farming as an old and recognized custom, mainly keeping livestock and planting crops, such as maize. The place has a wide range of natural resources, mainly wild plants, birds , floral nature, rocks and good weather.

The Mliba mountain is shaped as a pyramid and believed to be of great importance to the Magagula royalty. This is where most of the Suthu kings are laid or buried. It is believed that anyone who tempers with their graveyards may face a generational curse. The late Senator Chief Malamlela was hidden somehow somewhere around Mliba. 

Mliba town was founded by the Magagula and Mliba town is right above the famously notable hill known as Mkhutsali (Moyeni's Fortress). 

Therefore, Mliba is the main town that connects mini towns like Ka-Khuphuka, Mnjoli and Ka- Dvokolwako  .

References
Fitzpatrick, M., Blond, B., Pitcher, G., Richmond, S., and Warren, M. (2004)  South Africa, Lesotho and Swaziland. Footscray, VIC: Lonely Planet.

Populated places in Manzini Region